Kelly Slater's Pro Surfer is an extreme sports video game developed by Treyarch and published by Activision under the Activision O2 label. The game was endorsed by veteran surfer Kelly Slater and released for Game Boy Advance, GameCube, PlayStation 2 and Xbox in 2002, and for Microsoft Windows in 2003. To coincide with the game, Slater appeared as an unlockable character in the 2001 skateboarding video game Tony Hawk's Pro Skater 3, complete with surfboard.

Playable surfers

Included in base game 
 Kelly Slater
 Lisa Andersen
 Tom Carroll
 Tom Curren
 Nathan Fletcher
 Donavon Frankenreiter
 Bruce Irons
 Rob Machado
 Kalani Robb

Unlockable via career mode and cheat code 

 Tony Hawk
 Travis Pastrana
 "Tiki God"
 "Surfreak"

Reception

Kelly Slater's Pro Surfer received "generally favorable reviews" on all platforms except the Game Boy Advance version, which received "average" reviews, according to video game review aggregator Metacritic. Famitsu gave it a score of two sevens, one six, and one seven for a total of 27 out of 40. It was nominated for GameSpots annual "Best Alternative Sports Game on Xbox" award, which went to Tony Hawk's Pro Skater 4. It was also nominated for "Outstanding Original Sports Game" by the National Academy of Video Game Trade Reviewers, but lost to Jet Set Radio Future.

Notes

References

External links

2002 video games
Activision games
Aspyr games
Beenox games
Slater
Slater
Game Boy Advance games
GameCube games
Multiplayer and single-player video games
PlayStation 2 games
Surfing video games
Treyarch games
Video games based on real people
Video games developed in Canada
Video games developed in the United Kingdom
Windows games
Xbox games
Video games developed in the United States
HotGen games